Cymindis kuznetzowi is a species of ground beetle in the subfamily Harpalinae. It was described by Sundukov in 2001.

References

kuznetzowi
Beetles described in 2001